Valeriy Illich Konovalyuk (born 31 August 1966 in Donetsk), is a Ukrainian - Ukrainian state and public figure. Doctor of Economics (2004), academician Academy of Economic Sciences of Ukraine, People's Deputy of Ukraine III-IV and VI convocations, the author of 20 scientific works and 150 bills. Candidate for President of Ukraine in elections in 2014. Chairman of political party "All-Ukrainian Union" New Ukraine "(since 2014). He is known for heading the Konovalyuk Commission.

Education
In 1985 he graduated from Donetsk industrial technical school on a specialty "Maintenance and repair of motor vehicles", in 1989 - from the Moscow Higher Command School, in 1993 - The German Finance Academy (Munich) on the specialty "Economics and organization of production".

Labour activity
He worked as a mechanic at a motor enterprise (Makiivka city). 1989-1992 – officer of Western Group of Forces (Germany). 1992-1994 – he was the director of JSC "Ukrenergoresurs", and also a president of the broadcasting company "ВІКО" (Donetsk).

Since 1995, he worked as a deputy chairman of the executive committee of Donetsk (Kujbyshevo region) on questions of planning, finance and budget. In 1995, Valeriy Konovalyuk created and headed the People's Patriotic Union of Donbass. From 1996 till 1998 – Advisor to the Chairman, Deputy Chairman of Donetsk Regional State Administration.

The political and social activities
He has been elected to the Verhovna Rada three times (in 1998, 2002, and 2007). In 2000 he joined Labour Ukraine until he became a member of the Regions of Ukraine faction and a member of the Party of Regions. In April 2005 he left Party of Regions and re-joined Labour Ukraine. And was elected party leader of that party. In August 2007 Labour Ukraine members, and also Konovalyuk, decided to join the Party of Regions election list in the 2007 parliamentary election. Konovalyuk did not participate in the 2012 Ukrainian parliamentary election because he wanted "a timeout".

He was the first deputy head of the Budget Committee of  Verkhovna Rada; chairman of the subcommittee on questions of planning budgetary programs and control over the using of budgetary funds in Health Care of Health Care Committee.

The author of a number of bills: "Budget Code of Ukraine"; "On State Financial Control"; "On the State Treasury"; "On the financing of health care and mandatory medical insurance in Ukraine"; "Labor Code", «The reform of law enforcement agencies» and others.

In the summer of 2009 he was elected as a chairman of the All-Ukrainian Union of servicemen and veterans of the Ukrainian Armed Forces. Since June 2010 – Advisor to the President of Ukraine (out of state). In July 2012, he came out from the Party of Regions, because of disagreement with the policy of Yanukovych and the activity which led to a profound social and economic crisis.

March 30, 2014 he was registered in the Central Election Commission as a presidential candidate of Ukraine as a self-promoted. April 30, 2014 during his visit to the countries of the EU and Washington, Konovalyuk has presented his own plan of actions for the settlement of the crisis of Ukraine  in the US Congress with Senators and members of House of Representatives, as well as in many "think tanks" from the Atlantic Council to the Carnegie Foundation.

May 17, 2014 he was unanimously elected as the head of a political party "All-Ukrainian Union" New Ukraine" during a Congress of a public organization of All-Ukrainian Union "New Ukraine".

In the 2014 Ukrainian presidential election he received 0.38% of the vote.

In the 2014 parliamentary election Konovalyuk attempt to be re-elected into parliament as an independent candidate in single-member districts number 59 situated in the Maryinka failed after finishing 3rd with 8.50% of the votes.

Investing and financing activities
In August 2010, he became a chairman of the board of the Business Council "Ukraine-China" and was included in the Intergovernmental Ukrainian-Chinese Commission on questions of trade and economic cooperation. Since October 2012 he actively engaged in financial activities and the implementation of joint investment projects in countries of  the EU and Eastern Europe.

Awards
Honored Economist of Ukraine. Awarded by the Order "For Merit" II and III degree, Diploma of the Verkhovna Rada of Ukraine (2003), Diploma of the Government of Ukraine (2004).

Hobbies
Judo (master of sport), tennis and books. He headed the Judo Federation of Donetsk region. He speaks German and English.

Personal life
Valeriy Konovalyuk has four children. He has two children from his first marriage – daughter Eugenia (1993) and son Vladislav (1996). Now he is married for the second time on the Ukrainian TV presenter and journalist Valeria Ushakova. Two children: Ilya and Lukiya (2015).

External links
 Personal website 
 Facebook

References

1966 births
Living people
Party of Regions politicians
Third convocation members of the Verkhovna Rada
Fourth convocation members of the Verkhovna Rada
Sixth convocation members of the Verkhovna Rada
Candidates in the 2014 Ukrainian presidential election
Politicians from Donetsk
Recipients of the Honorary Diploma of the Cabinet of Ministers of Ukraine